Sally Roettger Harrell (born March 5, 1966) is an American politician from the state of Georgia. She is a Democrat and member of the Georgia Senate since 2019. She previously served in the Georgia House of Representatives from 1999 through 2005.

Early life and career
Harrell was on born March 5, 1966, in Indianapolis, Indiana. She holds a Bachelor's degree from Georgia State University and a Master of Social Work from the University of Georgia. Harrell lives in Chamblee, Georgia, with her husband Jay and their two children.

Prior to serving in the legislature, Harrell served as the Executive Director of the Healthy Mothers, Healthy Babies Coalition of Georgia.

Political career
Harrell was elected to the Georgia House of Representatives in 1998. In the Georgia House, she served on the Education, Human Relations & Aging, Children & Youth and Appropriations Committees (Health Sub-Committee). Harrell chose not to seek re-election to the Georgia House of Representatives in 2004 due to redistricting issues. The maps passed by the Georgia legislature in 2001 were thrown out and redrawn by the Court, blind of incumbent's addresses. Her district changed so massively geographically that she decided not to seek re-election.

Harrell explored running in the 2017 special election to represent  in the United States House of Representatives but ultimately decided not to file for the seat.

Harrell ran for the 40th district seat in the Georgia State Senate in the 2018 election. Harrell defeated incumbent Fran Millar.

References

External links
 Profile at the Georgia State Senate
 Official website

Living people
Democratic Party members of the Georgia House of Representatives
People from DeKalb County, Georgia
21st-century American politicians
Georgia State University alumni
University of Georgia alumni
1966 births
21st-century American women politicians
20th-century American politicians
20th-century American women politicians
Politicians from Indianapolis
Women state legislators in Georgia (U.S. state)